Chiautla de Tapia is a city and municipality in La Mixteca region of Puebla in south-eastern Mexico. The municipality of Chiautla has a surface area of 685.05 km² which makes it the largest municipality in the state of Puebla. The BUAP has a Regional Section there.

Notable figures 
 Gilberto Bosques Saldívar

References

External links 
 Chiautla de Tapia - Community site

Municipalities of Puebla